= Widemex =

Widemex International
- Company type: Privately owned
- Industry: Manufacturer
- Founded: 1954; 72 years ago
- Founder: Mr. Wientjes
- Headquarters: Helmond, The Netherlands (Headquarters)
- Products: Consumer goods
- Website: www.widemexinternational.com

Widemex International BV is a Dutch company that produces ironing board covers and ironing boards.

== History ==
The company was founded in 1954 in Amsterdam, The Netherlands by Mr. Wientjes. The name Widemex comes from the combination Wientjes Demonstration and Export. The company started initially with selling products by demonstrating them in stores. The products they sold were exported to various countries in Europe. One of its products was the metallized ironing board cover, at that time a complete new technical product for their market. After several years the company decided to sell only fabric which was laminated with foam, especially produced for ironing boards.

In 1970 the company was sold to the Nijhuis family. The new owners decided to move the company from Amsterdam to Geldrop, in the south of the Netherlands. The new owners stopped selling by demonstration and targeted on sales to larger companies and retailers. The production of ironing board covers became the company its core-business.

== Decorated fabrics ==
In 1972 world’s first decorated ironing board cover was presented by Widemex. This turned out to be a desired product under the consumers and therefore the company quickly expanded their range of decorated ironing board covers. The company offered their ironing board covers to ironing board producers around Europe which on their turn implemented the decorated fabrics into their production. The company’s assortment extended during the years with the production of various kitchen textiles. However, due to the massive import of these products in the mid-nineties from China and India the company decided to stop producing these products.

In the year 2000 the company was taken over by the Van der Maas family. The confection department was partly reduced after a reorganisation and therefore the company moved to a more appropriate location in Helmond, The Netherlands where the company is still situated today. Under supervision of the Van der Maas family the company extended their market share in Europe and became leading in her market segment. Today the company supplies ironing board covers to 35 countries over the world.
